Edward L. Graf was a member of the Wisconsin State Assembly.

Biography
Graf was born on January 17, 1878, in Fredonia, Wisconsin. He later resided in Milwaukee, Wisconsin.

Career
Graf was a member of the Assembly from 1939 to 1948. He was a Republican.

References

People from Fredonia, Wisconsin
Politicians from Milwaukee
Republican Party members of the Wisconsin State Assembly
1878 births
Year of death missing